A Martian Christmas is a Mexican-American sci-fi Christmas animated film, released direct-to-video on November 11, 2009. The film was produced by Ánima Estudios and Porchlight Entertainment. The film was directed by José Alejandro García Muñoz.

Although it was described as a "television movie", there is currently no further information about the film's air date or network.

Synopsis
Elementary school kids are at a school putting up decorations for the Christmas holidays.  While doing so, they get a strange visit.  A band of Martians (and their dog Rover) drop down and are  fascinated by what these bizarre Earthlings are doing.  They start asking the kids all sorts of questions about the holiday which the kids answer.  The thing that gives the Martians the most fascination is the singing which the students end up teaching them.

It is all good spirited as friendships start developing but then Darph Meanie – the Martin spaceship commander – comes and gets mad at the Martians for not having freeze-dried the Earthlings. Their original reason for having dropped into Earth was to pick up fuel for their spaceship – snow – which the elementary school kids are only happy to give them.  This culminates in a celebration of Christmas for everyone – the very first Martian Christmas!

Cast
 Cindy Robinson as Kip, Mary Kate
 K.C.D. Shannon as Zork, Dwight
 David Lodge as Gleeb, Santa Claus, Martian Leader
 Mac Grave as Ned, Drang, Martian Scientist
 Robert Mark Klein as Office Manager, Martian Officer
 Katie Leigh as Roxy
 Dave Mallow as VOX, Shopper

Production
On 6 October 2008, The Hollywood Reporter reported that A Martian Christmas is in development from Porchlight Entertainment and Ánima Estudios. Post-production services was handled by Telegael.

Reception
Sierra Filucci of Common Sense Media gave this film 2 out of 5 stars and said, "Unfortunately the build-up to the main part of the story -- the journey to Earth -- takes so long and is packed with so much backstory that kids and even adults might get lost, or just bored. Once the trip begins, things pick up and it's sort of interesting to see humans and Christmas from outsiders' eyes." Whoever IMDb gives a score of 8.1.

Release
This film was released on DVD on 11 November 2009 by PorchLight Home Entertainment. Due to its obscurity, it remains one of the rarest films to this day, most likely due to lack of promotion, and the fact that this film was primarily produced in Mexico, as it is difficult for a Mexican animated production to get into the United States market, according to producer Fernando de Fuentes. The DVD of the film is only available on online shopping sites, such as eBay and Amazon.com.

See also
 List of Christmas films

References

External links
 A Martian Christmas  on Ánima Estudios
 A Martian Christmas on Telegael
 
 
 

2009 films
2009 direct-to-video films
American animated comedy films
2009 comedy films
2009 action films
2000s American animated films
American flash animated films
Mexican animated films
Direct-to-video animated films
Films about Mexican Americans
American Christmas films
Mexican Christmas films
American science fiction comedy films
Mexican science fiction comedy films
Ánima Estudios films
Mars in film
2000s English-language films
2000s Mexican films